In symplectic topology, a Fukaya category of a symplectic manifold  is a  category  whose objects are Lagrangian submanifolds of , and morphisms are Floer chain groups: . Its finer structure can be described in the language of quasi categories as an A∞-category.

They are named after Kenji Fukaya who introduced the  language first in the context of Morse homology, and exist in a number of variants. As Fukaya categories are A∞-categories, they have associated derived categories, which are the subject of the celebrated  homological mirror symmetry conjecture of Maxim Kontsevich. This conjecture has been computationally verified   for a number of comparatively simple examples.

Formal definition

Let  be a symplectic manifold. For each pair of Lagrangian submanifolds , suppose they intersect transversely, then define the Floer cochain complex  which is a module generated by intersection points . The Fukaya category is an  category, meaning that besides ordinary compositions, there are higher composition maps

It is defined as follows. Choose a compatible almost complex structure  on the symplectic manifold . For generators  of the cochain complexes on the left, and any generator  of the cochain complex on the right, the moduli space of -holomorphic polygons with  faces with each face mapped into  has a count

in the coefficient ring. Then define

and extend  in a multilinear way.

The sequence of higher compositions  satisfy the  relation because the boundaries of various moduli spaces of holomorphic polygons correspond to configurations of degenerate polygons.

This definition of Fukaya category for a general (compact) symplectic manifold has never been rigorously given. The main challenge is the transversality issue, which is essential in defining the counting of holomorphic disks.

See also 

 Homotopy associative algebra

References

Bibliography
Denis Auroux, A beginner's introduction to Fukaya categories.

Paul Seidel, Fukaya categories and Picard-Lefschetz theory. Zurich lectures in Advanced Mathematics

External links
The thread on  MathOverflow 'Is the Fukaya category "defined"?'

Symplectic geometry
Categories in category theory